Will Dean may refer to:
 Will Dean (rower) (born 1987), Canadian rower
 Will Dean (footballer) (born 2000), English soccer player
 Will Dean (entrepreneur), English business founder

See also 
 William Deans